Ellis Abraham Davidson (1828 – March 9, 1878) was a British writer and educationalist. He is considered a pioneer in the teaching of techniques for art study. He was also well known as an art lecturer.

Biography
Ellis A. Davidson was born to a Jewish family in Hull, but at the age of ten moved to London, where his father worked as a chiropodist. 

He attended the London School of Design and the School of Art in South Kensington, and was one of the first teachers sent into the provinces by the Science and Art Department to establish schools of art. For several years he taught at the Government School of Arts and Crafts in Chester.

In 1866 Davidson was appointed principal art master of the City Middle Class School, a position which he resigned after six years in order to devote himself more completely to his literary career. As a lecturer, he delivered talks to such organisations as the Teachers' Training Association, the Horological Society, the Grenadier Guards, the London Mechanics' Institute, the Royal Society for the Prevention of Cruelty to Animals, and Jews' College. He also produced a series of models for class teaching of drawing, which were used in government and other schools.

Davidson took an active interest in several communal movements, especially those intended to promote the intellectual development of the adult members of the Jewish industrial classes. He was a committee member for the Association for Providing Free Lectures to Jewish Working Men and Their Families, the Society of Hebrew Literature, the Jewish Association for the Diffusion of Religious Knowledge, and other institutions.

Partial bibliography

References
 

1828 births
1878 deaths
19th-century British Jews
19th-century English male writers
19th-century English non-fiction writers
Alumni of the Royal College of Art
British art teachers
British draughtsmen
British textbook writers
English Jewish writers
Lecturers
Technical writers
Writers from Kingston upon Hull
Writers from London